Every Mother's Son is a lost 1918 silent war propaganda film produced and distributed by Fox Film Corporation and directed by Raoul Walsh.

Cast
Charlotte Walker - An American Mother
Percy Standing - An American Father
Edwin Stanley - Eldest Son
Ray Howard - Second Son
Gareth Hughes - Third Son
Corona Paynter - Daughter of France
Bernard Thornton - Lt. Von Sterbling

See also
1937 Fox vault fire

References

External links
Every Mother's Son at IMDb.com

1918 films
American silent feature films
Lost American films
Films directed by Raoul Walsh
Fox Film films
American black-and-white films
1918 war films
American World War I propaganda films
1918 lost films
Lost war films
1910s American films
Silent war films